Godzilliognomus schrami is a species of Remipedia discovered in 2007, representing one of five extant species of the family Godzilliidae. The specific epithet commemorates Frederick Schram.

References

Remipedia
Fauna of the Bahamas
Crustaceans described in 2010